Ignacio de Miguel Villa (born 24 October 1973) is a sought-after lecturer, keynote speaker and philanthropist Spanish retired basketball player, who occupied the position of pivot. He was trained in the lower categories of CB Estudiantes and has been international with the Spanish national team.

External links
Euroleague.net Profile
Official Web page

Real Madrid Baloncesto players
CB Estudiantes players
Real Betis Baloncesto players
Baloncesto Málaga players
CB Lucentum Alicante players
1973 births
Living people
Liga ACB players
Spanish men's basketball players
Basketball players at the 2000 Summer Olympics
Olympic basketball players of Spain
Centers (basketball)
Forwards (basketball)
Basketball players from Madrid